Elisabeta Anghel (born 21 October 1967) is a Romanian hurdler. She competed in the women's 100 metres hurdles at the 1996 Summer Olympics.

References

External links

1967 births
Living people
Athletes (track and field) at the 1996 Summer Olympics
Romanian female hurdlers
Olympic athletes of Romania
Place of birth missing (living people)